Arcadia Theater or Arcadia Theatre may refer to:

in Russia
Arcadia Theater (Russia), a theater company

in the United States
Arcadia Theatre (Olney, Illinois), 1927, closed in 2016
Arcadia Theater, in Windber, Pennsylvania
Arcadia Theater (Wellsboro, Pennsylvania), NRHP-listed in the Wellsboro Historic District
Arcadia Theater (Kerrville, Texas) (has commons pics)
Arcadia Theater (Floresville, Texas) (has commons pics)

in the United Kingdom
Arcadia Theatre, incorporated into the Futurist Theatre, (Scarborough, North Yorkshire), closed in 2019

See also
Arcada Theater, in Illinois